The Tenkodogo Power Station, also Zano Solar Power Station, is a  solar power plant in Burkina Faso. The solar farm is under development by a special purpose vehicle (SPV) company called Quadran Burkina Faso S.A. (Zano), created by the owners, to design, finance, build, own, operate and maintain the power station. The energy off-taker is Société Nationale d'électricité du Burkina Faso (SONABEL), the national electricity utility parastatal company, under a long-term power purchase agreement.

Location
The power station would be located in Zano Village, near the town of Tenkodogo, in Boulgou Province, in the Centre-Est Region of the country.

Overview
The power station has a 24 megawatt capacity. Its output will be sold directly to the SONABEL for integration into the national grid. It has been estimated that the energy generated here could power approximately 75,000 Burkinabe households. The power station, which consists of 54,500 photovoltaic panels, generates 48 GWh annually.

Developers
The power station is owned and is under development by the SPV company called Quadran Burkina Faso S.A. The table below illustrates the shareholding in Quadran Burkina Faso S.A.

 MIHIA ("Make It Happen In Africa") is a joint venture between Qair, a French IPP (51 percent) and Stoa Infrastructure & Energy (STOA), a French financial house (49 percent ownership).
 STOA is jointly owned by Caisse des Dépôts et Consignations (CDC) (83.3 percent ownership) and French Development Agency (AFD) (16.7 percent ownership).

Costs, funding, and commissioning

The cost of construction has ben reported as €25.7 million (approx. US$30 million). Funding has been provided by a number of development partners, including (1) FMO (Netherlands) (2) Access to Energy Fund (AEF) (3) Proparco. It is anticipated that he completed power station will come online during the second half of 2022.

See also

 List of power stations in Burkina Faso
 Kodeni Solar Power Station

References

External links
 Approximate Location of Tenkodogo Solar Power Station
 Proparco Participates In The Financing Of Solar Power Plants In Burkina Faso As of 17 November 2021.

Solar power stations in Burkina Faso
Boulgou Province
Centre-Est Region
Energy infrastructure in Africa